Apaegocera is a genus of moths of the family Noctuidae. The genus was erected by George Hampson in 1905.

Species
 Apaegocera argyrogramma Hampson, 1905
 Apaegocera aurantipennis Hampson, 1912

References

Agaristinae